Smuggler's Moon is the eighth historical mystery novel about Sir John Fielding by Bruce Alexander (a pseudonym for Bruce Cook).

Plot summary
Sir John and Jeremy are sent to East Anglia to investigate smuggling, but when the smugglers turn to murder, Sir John takes it as a brazen assault on the law.

2001 American novels
Sir John Fielding series
G. P. Putnam's Sons books